Leeds Grammar School was an independent school founded 1552 in Leeds, West Yorkshire, England. Originally a male-only school, in August 2005 it merged with Leeds Girls' High School to form The Grammar School at Leeds. The two schools physically united in September 2008.

The school was founded in 1552 by William Sheafield to provide free, subsidised or fee-paying education to the children of the City of Leeds. Despite 1552 being the traditional date for the foundation of the school, there is some evidence to suggest that the school existed as early as 1341. In 1805, the school was the subject of a ruling by Lord Eldon that set a precedent affecting grammar schools throughout England.

History
Leeds Grammar School was founded in 1552, following the death of the Reverend William Sheafield in July of that year. Sheafield left £14 13s. 4d. in his will to maintain a schoolmaster "to teach and instruct freely for ever all such Younge Schollars Youthes and Children as shall come and resort to him from time to time to be taught instructed and informed", provided that a school house was built by the town of Leeds.
The date for the school's foundation remains in doubt. Records indicate that there was a grammar school in Leeds as early as 1341. The school's first site is thought to have been in The Calls, by the River Aire, near the centre of the city. By about 1579 the school was in the New Chapel building at the head of Headingley Lane, where it remained until 1624. That year John Harrison, a great Leeds benefactor, removed the school "to a pleasant Field of his own which he surrounded with a substantial Wall and in the midst of the Quadrangle built the present Fabrick of the school". Harrison's school was on North Lane, on the site of the Grand Theatre opposite St John's Church. Through the years, the school grew steadily in numbers and reputation. Harrison's building was added onto in the 1640s by a new library, thanks to the endowment of Godfrey Lawson (Mayor of Leeds, 1669–70). The Lawson Library remains with the school (although it has moved to a number of different physical locations) making it the oldest library in Leeds. It was refurbished in 2007.

Towards the end of the 18th century, demand for Latin and Greek was falling, while Leeds was growing as a centre of commerce and industry.
In 1791 the trustees proposed to appoint a third master, to teach writing and accounts, and a fourth to teach French and other modern languages. The plan was opposed by the master and usher. With the two sides unable to agree, a suit in the Court of Chancery began in 1795. In 1805, Lord Eldon, the Lord Chancellor, in a ruling that set a precedent for grammar schools across the country, proclaimed, "There is no authority for thus changing the nature of the Charity, and filling a School intended for the purpose of teaching Greek and Latin with Scholars learning the German and French languages, mathematics, and anything except Greek and Latin." He offered as a compromise that other subjects might be taught, as long as all boys also learnt the classical languages. On the death of the master in 1815, the trustees appointed one of their number as acting master, and effected the desired changes.

By 1857, Leeds was growing prodigiously during the Industrial Revolution. The city conditions were dirty and Harrison's buildings inadequate for a Victorian education. In 1857 the decision was made by Rev. Alfred Barry (Headmaster) to move the school to new premises next to Woodhouse Moor. The building, in Gothic Revival style, opened in June 1859. The building was designed by Edward Middleton Barry, brother of the headmaster, Rev. Alfred Barry, after whom one of the eight houses was named. At that time the school roll numbered fewer than 100 boys and the buildings were planned for 200. Serious consideration was given in the 1920s to moving the school to Lawnswood – the current site of Leeds University's playing fields.

The school was in the direct grant scheme in the 1950s to 1970s, and the assisted places scheme in the 1970s to 1990s. Throughout the 20th century the school continued to expand, with the building of a swimming pool, sports hall, theatre, a design and technology department, assembly hall and classroom block. By the 1990s, the roll had risen to over 1,100 boys and the school operated on three separate sites. Despite continuous improvements to accommodate increased numbers and the requirements of a contemporary curriculum, no further development of the facilities was economically viable without great detriment to the education of the pupils. The area of Leeds surrounding the school, Hyde Park, was in decline and the University of Leeds was also seeking to expand and so the decision was taken by the school governors and the university to exchange the Woodhouse Moor, Junior School and Lawnswood premises for a university-owned  site in Alwoodley to the north of Leeds.  The Woodhouse Moor premises are now occupied by Leeds University Business School.

In September 1997, at a cost of £18.5 million and after three years construction, Leeds Grammar School opened in Alwoodley Gates. In 1999 a new Headmaster Dr Mark Bailey was appointed. Following the shrinking of Leeds' child population, staff shortages and Leeds Girls' High School's need for more adequate modern buildings the decision was taken to merge with Leeds Girls' High School in 2003. The school passed out of existence on 4 July 2008, although it had been legally dissolved since August 2005.

Houses
Leeds Grammar School has eight houses, named after individuals connected with the school or its formation. This system dates back to 1924, with the original school houses being Clarell, Sheafield, Neville and Thoresby. Currently there are eight houses:

Barry – after Rev. Alfred Barry, PhD, who planned the move of Leeds Grammar School to its site in Woodhouse Moor, which it occupied between 1859 and 1997.
Clarell – after Thomas Clarell, Vicar of Leeds from 1430 to 1469, and founder of the Clarell Chantry, in which was employed William Sheafield as chantry priest.
Ermystead – after William Ermystead, who paid for the construction of the Lady Lane site in the 1590s.
Harrison – after John Harrison, benefactor of Leeds, who built the school its third site on North Street.
Lawson – after Godfrey Lawson, Mayor of Leeds, who endowed to the school the Lawson Library – the oldest library in Leeds.
Nevile – for Sir John Nevil of Birstall- one of the first trustees of the school.
Sheafield – after William Sheafield, who is traditionally thought of as the founder of the school in 1552, by virtue of the date of signature of his will, which endowed the school.
Thoresby – after Ralph Thoresby, topographer of Leeds and alumnus of the school.

There are many competitions throughout the school year, the most notable of these being Sports day and House music. Any house activity, be it a win or a draw, results in the acquiring of House Points. All eight houses compete throughout the year for the coveted Bailey Cup – awarded at the end of the year for the house with the most House Points.

Following the merger with Leeds Girls High School four of these houses (Thoresby, Neville, Clarell and Barry) were removed. Four houses have been created from alumnae important to Leeds Girls High School (Eddison, Ford, Lupton and Powell) thereby maintaining the current eight-house system at GSAL.

Merger with Leeds Girls' High School

The school administration merged with Leeds Girls' High School in August 2005, and the two schools physically merged in September 2008. At that time the Senior School (ages 11–18) and Junior School (ages 7–11) will remain at their present Alwoodley Site. The Infant School will move to the former LGHS site at Headingley alongside a new Nursery School. The merged school will be called The Grammar School at Leeds. The main Senior School site of Leeds Girls' High School will be sold to a private developer. Classes for girls and boys between the ages of 11 and 16 will remain segregated, but all extracurricular activities will be mixed.

The merger of the two schools has caused some controversy due to the expected increase in traffic levels at the Alwoodley site.

Leodiensian
Leodiensian is the name given to the school magazine of Leeds Grammar School; the first edition was published in October 1827, and it became a regular annual publication from 1882, making it one of the longest-running school publications. The name Leodiensian is derived from the Latin name for Leeds, Ledesia (and later Leodis), and in an adjectival form can be seen in the School Song, in the phrase "Leodenses cuncti".

Old Leodiensian
A former pupil of Leeds Grammar School is described as an Old Leodiensian. In popular culture, Old Leodiensian  features in the Kaiser Chiefs' song "I Predict a Riot":

"Would never have happened to Smeaton, an old Leodiensian"

The line features John Smeaton a famous pupil of the school, and was written by the Kaiser Chiefs' lead singer Ricky Wilson who is himself an Old Leodiensian.

Headmasters

Notable alumni

Alumni from Leeds Grammar School are called "Old Leodiensians" or "Old Leo's". Notable Old Leo's include:

 Thomas Adam (1701–1784) – Church of England clergyman and religious writer.
 Thomas T Adamson-Coumbousis – Channel 4 News, TV Reporter/Producer
 Thomas Barnard, clergyman 
 Arthur Bayldon, poet
 Beau (b. 1946) – folk singer (Trevor Midgley)
 Irwin Bellow, Baron Bellwin (1923–2001) – Conservative minister
 Gordon Benson (b. 1994) – triathlete for Great Britain
 John Berkenhout M.D. (1726–91) – English physician, naturalist and miscellaneous writer
 Tim Birkhead FRS (b. 1950) professor of behaviour and evolution
 Robin Blaze – countertenor
 Jon Blundy FRS (b. 1961) – geologist, Professor of Petrology at University of Bristol
 Richard Boon, manager of Buzzcocks and the New Hormones record label
 Albert Braithwaite, Conservative M.P.
 William Henry Brookfield (1809–74) – Inspector of Schools, and chaplain-in-ordinary to Queen Victoria.
 William Arthur Brown (b. 1945) – Master of Darwin College, Cambridge
 Jeff Christie Pop singer Yellow River 1970 No.1 in the Charts
Charles West Cope (1811–1890) Victorian era painter of genre and history scenes
 Keith Cox (1933–1998) geologist and academic at the University of Oxford
 Robert Crosthwaite (1837–1925) inaugural Bishop of Beverley
 Geoffrey Crowther, Baron Crowther (1907–1972) – economist, editor of The Economist
 Barry Cryer (1935–2022) – Comedian and comedy writer
 Alan Davidson – author, diplomat, food writer
 Sir Thomas Dennison, Judge of King's Bench
 Howard Devoto – Ex-lead singer of Buzzcocks, Magazine and Luxuria
 Lord "Jack" Diamond (John Diamond) (1907–2004) – Politician, Member of parliament, and leader of the Social Democratic Party in the House of Lords
 George Dixon – MP for Birmingham, also Edgbaston. Educationalist
 Jeremy Dyson – scriptwriter especially for The League of Gentlemen
 Lord John Dyson b.1943 Master of The Rolls 2012 – 2016 
 Matthew Elliott – CEO of Vote Leave
 Ralph Emmerson (1913–2008) – Bishop of Knaresborough from 1972 to 1979
 Ernest Farrar (1885–1918) – composer
 James Fawcett (professor) B.D. 
 Robin Flower (1881–1946) – poet
 John Freeborn (b. 1919) – Battle of Britain RAF pilot
 Mike Hann Wimbledon Junior Champion 1955. Wing Commander RAF
 Richard Harrington MP (b. 1957) – Member of Parliament for Watford, 2010 –
 Tony Harrison (b. 1937) – poet
 Sir John Hawkshaw (1811–91) – Engineer (railways, canals, tunnels)
 George Henderson (1854–1903) –  British soldier and military historian most famous for his work regarding the American Civil War and Stonewall Jackson
 Henry Bendelack Hewetson (1850–1899) – ophthalmologist and naturalist
 Sir Jack Hibbert – director of the Central Statistical Office, 1985–92.
 Ken Hodcroft – Chairman of Hartlepool United F.C.
 George Edward Holderness – eminent Anglican priest in the second half of the 20th century
 Arthur Michael Hollis – eminent Anglican clergyman in the mid 20th century.
Peter Matthew Hutton (born 1966) – Sports media executive and former commentator
 John Ireland (1879–1962) – composer
 Samuel Waite Johnson (1831–1912) – mechanical engineer
 Donald Kaberry, Baron Kaberry of Adel (1907–91) – politician, Member of Parliament for Leeds North West
 Sir Gerald Kaufman (1930–2017) – Member of Parliament
 Reverend Geoffrey Anketell Studdert Kennedy (Woodbine Willy) – priest and counsellor in World War I
 Theophilus Lindsey, Vicar of Catterick
 Frank Marsh (1936–2011) – consultant nephrologist
 William Ryott Maughan (1863–1933) – English-born Australian politician
 Alston James Weller May – 2nd Bishop of Northern Rhodesia
 Stanley Metcalfe (1932–2017) – cricketer
 Isaac Milner D.D., Dean of Carlisle and Master of Queens, Cambridge
 Joseph Milner LL.D. (1744–97) – English evangelical divine and Headmaster.
 Colin Montgomerie (attended circa 1980–82) – Golf Professional
 Patrick Munro (1883–1942) Conservative M.P. and international rugby union player
 William Nicholson, 1st Baron Nicholson (1845–1918) – Field Marshal
 Richard Peacock (1820–89) – Engineer; railway locomotive designer
 Christopher Price – politician
 Joseph Proctor (academic) D.D. Master of Catherine Hall.
 Joseph Bancroft Reade FRS (1801–70) – Clergyman, amateur scientist and pioneer of photography
 James Buchanan Seaton Archdeacon of Johannesburg and later Bishop of Wakefield
 Sydney Selwyn (1934–1996), British physician, medical scientist and notable expert in the history of medicine.
 Christopher Serpell 1910 – 1991 BBC Diplomatic Correspondent Father was Senior Master.
 Guy Sigsworth – electronica producer and was member of the band Frou Frou
 John Smeaton (1724–94) –  civil and mechanical engineer famous for building the third Eddystone Lighthouse, and for many other engineering projects.
 Barnett Stross (1899–1967) – doctor and politician
 Dave Syers (b. 1987) – Professional footballer for Bradford City
 Godfrey Talbot – war-time BBC correspondent; later the BBC's first officially-accredited royal correspondent.
 Thomas Pridgin Teale – surgeon and ophthalmologist
 Ralph Thoresby (1658–1724) – Merchant, dissenter, and author of the first history of Leeds, Ducatus Leodiensis, in 1715
 John Rowe Townsend – children's writer
 Gary Verity – Farmer, Deputy Lord Lieutenant of West Yorkshire and Tour de Yorkshire promoter
 Lawrence Wager (1904–65) – geologist, explorer and mountaineer
 David Warburton (1919–1941) – cricketer
 Nigel Waterson MP (b. 1950) – Member of Parliament for Eastbourne
 Philip Wilby (b. 1949) – composer
 Christopher Wilson (bishop), Bishop of Bristol
 Ricky Wilson – Lead singer of the Kaiser Chiefs.
Olly Cracknell- Rugby player for Wales and Opsreys
Mark Kielesz-Levine (b.1985) – Television Journalist and Presenter.

Notable teachers
 Alan Aldous (1923–92) – Headmaster from 1970–75
 Alfred Barry (1826–1910) – Headmaster from 1854–62; later the third Bishop of Sydney, 1884–89
 Joanne Harris – Author of Chocolat, Gentlemen & Players (Imaginary school based partly on Leeds Grammar School), et al.
 Cyril Norwood – Classics master, later Headmaster of Harrow School
 Samuel Pullen (1598–1667), first master, under the second endowment of the school, and later Church of Ireland Archbishop of Tuam.
 Richard Vickerman Taylor (b. 1830) – Assistant master, later priest and historian
 Anthony Verity – Headmaster from 1976–86, went on to head Dulwich College
 Philip Britton MBE FInstP – Head of Physics, Deputy Head Academic, Head of Foundation at Bolton School

See also
Listed buildings in Leeds (Hyde Park and Woodhouse)

References

External links 
The Grammar School at Leeds website
 GCSE and Value Added statistics from the Department for Education and Skills
 16+ statistics from DfES
  History of Leeds Grammar School, including the full text of a number of books about the school
 The Leodiensian, No. 1 Vol. 1, October 1827

Educational institutions established in the 1550s
Defunct schools in Leeds
 
1552 establishments in England
Member schools of the Headmasters' and Headmistresses' Conference
Educational institutions disestablished in 2008
2008 disestablishments in England
Diamond schools
Leeds Blue Plaques
Edward Middleton Barry buildings